Gestingthorpe (pronounced  , 'guesstingthorpe') is a village and a civil parish in the Braintree district, in the English county of Essex. It is approximately halfway between the towns of Halstead in Essex and Sudbury in Suffolk. The nearest railway station is in Sudbury, which offers a shuttle service to Marks Tey and at the extremes of the day to Colchester. The village is situated at a set of crossroads, North End Road, Nether Hill, Sudbury Road and Church Street.

In the 19th century the Manor of Over Hall in Gestingthorpe was the home of the Oates family, whose most famous son, the Antarctic explorer Captain Lawrence Oates, was born in Putney, London on 16 March 1880. The Oates were originally a West Riding of Yorkshire family until they succeeded to the manor. In 1913 his brother officers erected a memorial to Captain Oates in the parish church of St Mary the Virgin.

Just north of the village is Gestingthorpe Roman Villa, the site of a farmstead in the Celtic and Roman periods. The site has produced many archaeological finds including roof tiles, glass and a small ring with an engraving of a lion attacking a deer. The property remains a working farm, but  visitors are accepted by appointment.

The parish church of St Mary the Virgin is a Grade I listed building.

The church has a ring of 6 bells.

References

Information about the village 
St Mary the Virgin, Knights-Hospitallers website

External links

Gestingthorpe at essexchurches.info
St Mary the Virgin at achurchnearyou.com 
Gestingthorpe History Group

Villages in Essex
Civil parishes in Essex
Braintree District